Nicotania setchellii is a Nicotiana species of wild tobacco. It is native to Peru.

References

Flora of Peru
setchellii
Plants described in 1941